The brown fulvetta (Alcippe brunneicauda) is a species of bird in the family Alcippeidae.
It is found in Brunei, Indonesia, Malaysia, and Thailand.
Its natural habitat is subtropical or tropical moist lowland forest.
It is threatened by habitat loss.

There are two subspecies:

 A. b. brunneicauda (Salvadori, 1879) – Malay Peninsula, Sumatra, Batu Islands
 A. b. eriphaea (Oberholser, 1922) – Borneo and northern Natuna Islands

References

Collar, N. J. & Robson C. 2007. Family Timaliidae (Babblers)  pp. 70 – 291 in; del Hoyo, J., Elliott, A. & Christie, D.A. eds. Handbook of the Birds of the World, Vol. 12. Picathartes to Tits and Chickadees. Lynx Edicions, Barcelona.

brown fulvetta
Birds of Malesia
brown fulvetta
Taxonomy articles created by Polbot